Rosiere is an unincorporated community on the border of Kewaunee County and Door County in Wisconsin, in the towns of Lincoln, and Brussels.

History
The post office in Rosiere was established in 1871, and Charles Rubens (1827–1903) served as the first postmaster.

Wind farm 
In 1999, Rosiere became the site of the Rosiere Wind Farm, a wind power site that sits on  near the community. At its completion, the plant was the largest wind farm in the eastern United States and was built on land leased from landowners in the area.

Although the layout was intended to minimize the sound of the blades, two neighbors sued in 2004 over negative effects from the turbines. Other complaints about the turbines included shadows, poor TV reception, traffic, and the sickening of cows. Some health effects were thought to be a result of stray voltage. The turbines have not hurt residential property values. Each turbine kills an estimated 1.29 birds and 4.26 bats per year based on 1998-2001 data.

Massart Farmstead 
In 1984, the Massart Farmstead buildings were moved from Rosiere to Heritage Hill State Park in Allouez near Green Bay, Wisconsin. Seven buildings were relocated.

Gallery

See also
Garden Township, Michigan on the Garden Peninsula, site of the Garden Wind Farm

References

Unincorporated communities in Wisconsin
Unincorporated communities in Door County, Wisconsin
Unincorporated communities in Kewaunee County, Wisconsin